The People's Freedom Movement was a political party in Jamaica. It first contested national elections in 1955, but received only 647 votes and failed to win a seat. It did not contest any further elections. The party made a submission to the Joint Select Committee considering Jamaica's independence constitution, arguing for the inclusion of a provision that would allow for a referendum on becoming a republic. The submission was not accepted.

References

Defunct political parties in Jamaica
Republican parties
Republicanism in Jamaica